Trinity Church is a historic Episcopal church located at Constantia in Oswego County, New York.  It is a small frame vernacular Federal style structure completed in 1831–1834.  The last record of it having been painted is 1851.  Also on the property is a cemetery with most gravestones dating to the mid 19th century.  William H. Baker (1827-1911) is interred in the cemetery.

It was listed on the National Register of Historic Places in 1982.

References

Churches on the National Register of Historic Places in New York (state)
Episcopal church buildings in New York (state)
Federal architecture in New York (state)
Churches completed in 1834
19th-century Episcopal church buildings
Churches in Oswego County, New York
National Register of Historic Places in Oswego County, New York